The blue-capped rock thrush (Monticola cinclorhyncha) is a species of bird in the family Muscicapidae.

Description

The male has a blue head, chin and throat. The upper parts are blue and black. The rump and underparts are chestnut brown. There is a white patch on the wing that is visible during flight. The female bird is brown with a brown and white underside.

Distribution and breeding
The blue-capped rock thrush breeds in the foothills of the Himalayas and winters in the hill forests of southern India. During winter it is found throughout Pakistan, Bangladesh (passage migrant), parts of Myanmar and India, especially in the Western Ghats region.

Habits
Like thrushes, they fly up into trees and sit motionless when they are disturbed. It is a summer visitor in parts of Afghanistan and along the Himalayas from Pakistan to Arunachal Pradesh. In summer it is found in pine forests and hill slopes. In winter it is found in dense canopied forests.

References

blue-capped rock thrush
Birds of the Himalayas
blue-capped rock thrush
Articles containing video clips